Jolgeh-ye Chah Hashem may refer to:
 Jolgeh-ye Chah Hashem District
 Jolgeh-ye Chah Hashem Rural District